Trapeze Artist (foaled 17 September 2014) is a four-time Group 1 winning Australian bred thoroughbred racehorse.

Racing career
As a 2 year old Trapeze Artist won two races including the Black Opal Stakes.  He also finished 6th in the Golden Slipper.

As a 3 year old he won his first Group 1 race the Golden Rose Stakes by a record margin of 4 lengths after being backed in from odds of 90/1 into 40/1.

Further Group 1 success was achieved by winning the TJ Smith Stakes in a race record time, bettering the race time of Black Caviar.

Three weeks later he won a further Group 1 in the All Aged Stakes, and his last race win came in the Group 1 Canterbury Stakes when ridden by Blake Shinn.

At his final race start in the TJ Smith Stakes, the horse finished unplaced and suffered a shoulder injury throughout the race and was immediately retired.

Stud career
In 2019, Trapeze Artist commenced stallion duties at Widden Stud.  His service fee for a first year stallion was set at an Australian record amount of $90,000 per service.

References 
 

2014 racehorse births
Racehorses bred in Australia
Racehorses trained in Australia